Tracey Seaward (born 1965) is an English film producer.

Seaward was educated at Wolfreton School and Hull College, before studying film and cultural studies at Trinity College, Leeds. She has produced the Stephen Frears-directed films Dirty Pretty Things (2002), Mrs Henderson Presents (2005), The Queen (2006), Chéri (2009) and Tamara Drewe (2010). The Queen was awarded the BAFTA Award for Best Film in 2007, which Seaward shared with the other two producers.

In 2008 Seaward was presented with an honorary degree from the University of Hull.

In 2012 Seaward was the Producer of the Summer Olympics opening ceremony in London.

Filmography 
1968. Szczesliwego Nowego Roku (1992) — Assistant producer
Widows' Peak (1994) — Co-producer
Nothing Personal (1995) — Producer
The Serpent's Kiss (1997) — Co-producer
Babymother (1998) — Co-producer
eXistenZ (1999) — Head of production
Nora (2000) — Producer
Dirty Pretty Things (2002) — Producer
The Good Thief (2002) — Co-producer
Millions (2004) — Co-producer
The Constant Gardener (2005) — Co-producer
Mrs Henderson Presents (2005) — Line producer
The Queen (2006) — Producer
Eastern Promises (2007) — Producer
Chéri (2009) — Producer
Tamara Drewe (2010) — Producer
War Horse (2011) — Co-producer
Isles of Wonder (2012) — Co-executive producer
Happy and Glorious (2012) — Co-executive producer
Genius (2016) — Co-producer
Florence Foster Jenkins (2016)
Victoria & Abdul (2017)
The Two Popes (2019)

Awards 
2003 — Alexander Korda Award for Best British Film, Dirty Pretty Things (Nominated)
2003 — European Film Award, Dirty Pretty Things (Nominated)
2007 — BAFTA Award for Best Film, The Queen (Won)
2007 — Alexander Korda Award for Best British Film, The Queen (Nominated)
2007 — Academy Award for Best Film, The Queen (Nominated)
2007 — PGA Award for Motion Picture Producer of the Year, The Queen (Nominated)

References

External links 

Tracey Seaward at the British Film Institute

1965 births
English film producers
Living people
Film producers from Kingston upon Hull
People educated at Wolfreton School
Filmmakers who won the Best Film BAFTA Award
WFTV Award winners